Akechi Station (明智駅) is the name of two train stations located in Gifu Prefecture, Japan:

 Akechi Station (Ena)
 Akechi Station (Kani)